ABN AMRO I (also Team Delta Lloyd) is a Volvo Open 70 yacht. She won the 2005–06 Volvo Ocean Race skippered by Mike Sanderson.

She also competed in the 2008–09 Volvo Ocean Race as Team Delta Lloyd skippered by Ger O'Rourke.

2005-06 crew
The line-up was led by skipper Mike Sanderson and technical director Roy Heiner and included Brad Jackson - Watch Captain (NZL) (New Zealand Endeavour/Merit Cup/Tyco), Tony Mutter - Helmsman Trimmer (NZL) (Swedish Match/Team SEB) David Endean - Trimmer Pitman (NZL) (Tyco) Jan Dekker - Bowman (FRA/RSA) (Merit Cup/Tyco) Robert Greenhalgh - Helmsman Trimmer (UK) Justin Slattery - Bowman (IRE) (News Corp) and Stan Honey - Navigator (USA). Replacement crew included Mark Christensen (NZL), Sidney Gavignet (FRA) and Brian Thompson (GBR).

References

2000s sailing yachts
Sailing yachts built in the Netherlands
Sailboat type designs by Juan Kouyoumdjian
Sailing yachts of the Netherlands
Volvo Ocean Race yachts
Volvo Open 70 yachts